Ordinary Heroes is a 1999 Hong Kong drama film directed and produced by Ann Hui. Based on real-life prototypes, the film focused on social activists in the 1970s and 1980s who fought defiantly against the British Colonial government for the rights of the Yau Ma Tei boat people and their mainland wives. Mostly leftists and Communist sympathisers, their despair after the 1989 Tiananmen Square massacre is also highlighted.

The Chinese title refers to a popular Teresa Teng song which played during the film. Ordinary Heroes was critically acclaimed, winning Best Picture at the 19th Hong Kong Film Awards and the 36th Golden Horse Awards in Taiwan, among others.

Cast
Loletta Lee as Sow Fung-tai (credited as Rachel Lee)
Lee Kim-yu as teenaged Sow Fung-tai
Lee Kang-sheng as Lee Siu-tung
Cheung Nga-kwan as teenaged Lee Siu-tung
Anthony Wong as Father Kam
Tse Kwan-ho as Yau Ming-foon
Paw Hee-ching as Lee's mother
Lawrence Ah Mon as police officer
Mok Chiu-yu as street performer
Ann Hui as director (cameo)

Awards
It won the prestigious Best Picture award at the 19th Hong Kong Film Awards, as well as five awards at the Golden Horse Film Festival, including Best Film. It was chosen as Hong Kong's official Best Foreign Language Film submission at the 72nd Academy Awards, but did not manage to receive a nomination. It was also entered into the 49th Berlin International Film Festival.

See also
 List of submissions to the 72nd Academy Awards for Best Foreign Language Film
 List of Hong Kong submissions for the Academy Award for Best Foreign Language Film

References

External links

A review of Ordinary Heroes at loveHKfilm
 HK cinemagic entry

1999 films
1999 drama films
Hong Kong New Wave films
1990s Cantonese-language films
Best Film HKFA
Films directed by Ann Hui
Films shot in Hong Kong
Films set in Hong Kong
Films whose director won the Best Director Golden Horse Award
Films set in the 1970s
Films set in the 1980s
Best Feature Film Golden Horse Award winners
1990s historical drama films
Hong Kong historical drama films
1990s Hong Kong films